Vsun is a Chinese smartphone manufacturer based in Shenzhen, Guangdong. The company was founded in 2011 as Shenzhen Vsun Communication Technology Co., Ltd, and has registered the Vsun brand name in many parts of the world.

History

Vsun has been designing, producing and selling mobile phones for over a decade. It has a presence in the Middle East, Africa, Turkey and CIS countries.

Distribution
The distribution partners and retailers are from Saudi Arabia, Bahrain, Qatar, Kuwait, Oman, Egypt, Turkey, Afghanistan, Jordan, Kenya, Nigeria, and several other countries.

Profile

The company has opened up a large regional head office in Business Bay, Dubai, UAE in 2015 in the name of Vsun Electronics Trading L.L.C, and a North Africa hub office in Cairo, Egypt. The company, which has its main head office in Shenzhen, Guangdong, China, has a software design house, R&D facilities and multiple manufacturing facilities. The company in Dubai is called Vsun Mobility.

The company also set up its first Indian assembly unit in Bawal, Haryana, India. It has more than 40 assembly lines itself in the 10 acres of land area with having the capacity to produce more than 40 million devices each year.

Products
The company entered the mobile phone market in 2011. The company launches their products first in UAE and then distributes  worldwide. Vsun company has large number of warehouses in Al Quoz area which is located in Dubai, UAE. Distributions are done from these warehouses to other locations with several countries by air, ship and land cargo.

2016

2015

2014

2013

Awards
Vsun received VAR Awards in May 2015, and was named to the Fastest growing Smartphone brand in the UAE

References

External links
Official website

Consumer electronics brands
Manufacturing companies based in Shenzhen
Mobile phone manufacturers
Electronics companies of China
Privately held companies of China
Mobile phone companies of China
Chinese brands
Companies established in 2011
2011 establishments in China